Roman Mählich (born 17 September 1971) is an Austrian football manager and a former player.

Club career
A stocky midfielder, Mählich started his professional career at Wiener Sportclub before moving to FC Tirol Innsbruck in 1994. After one season in Tyrol, he joined Sturm Graz and had his most successful period with them, winning 2 league titles and 3 domestic cups, as well as playing in the UEFA Champions League.

After 8 seasons in Graz, he played for some lower league sides as well as for the Austria Wien reserves.

International career
He made his debut for Austria in a September 1992 friendly match against Portugal and was a participant at the 1998 FIFA World Cup. He earned 20 caps, no goals scored. His last international was a May 2002 friendly match against Germany.

Coaching career
Mählich has been head coach of Parndorf, SC Lassee, SC Mannsdorf, SV St. Margarethen, and the reserve team for Austria Wien. He was head coach of Parndorf from 1 July 2009 to 31 December 2009. His first match was a 5–1 win against Team für Wien on 7 August 2009. The following week, they were knocked out by Rapid Wien in extra time in the first round of the Austrian Cup. His final match was a 1–1 draw against Zwettl on 13 November 2009. He was head coach of Lassee between 1 January 2010 and 12 May 2012. Then he took over Mannsdorf between 24 September 2012 and 20 October 2013. His first match was a 3–2 loss against Leobendorf on 29 October 2012. His final match was a 4–1 loss against Bad Vöslau. He was head coach of  St. Margarethen between 1 July 2014 and when he was appoint head coach of the reserve team of Austria Wien. His first match was a 1–1 draw against Klingenbach. His final match was a 2–2 draw against Pinkafeld on 21 March 2015. Mählich became the head coach of the reserve team for Austria Wien on 25 March 2015. After the season, he became a coach in the academy. Andreas Ogris replaced him on 22 June 2015.

On 16 September 2019 he was hired by SC Austria Lustenau.

Coaching record

Honours
Austrian Football Bundesliga (2):
 1998, 1999
Austrian Cup (3):
 1996, 1997, 1999

References

External links

 
 
 Roman Mählich at Footballdatabase

1971 births
Living people
Footballers from Vienna
Austrian footballers
Austria international footballers
1998 FIFA World Cup players
FC Tirol Innsbruck players
SK Sturm Graz players
Association football midfielders
Austrian football managers
SC Austria Lustenau managers
SC Wiener Neustadt managers
SK Sturm Graz managers
FK Austria Wien non-playing staff